Kangaku (漢学, かんがく, Kyūjitai: 漢學) was the pre-modern Japanese study of China. Kangaku was the counterpart of kokugaku and Yōgaku or Rangaku. Scholars of kangaku are called kangakusha (漢学者).

Kangaku and sinology 
In modern Japan, sinology (Chugokugaku, 中国学, or formerly Shinagaku, 支那学) refers to Western and modern Chinese studies, whereas kangaku refers to traditional or pre-modern studies.

The Chinese term for sinology, 漢學, and Japanese kangaku are represented by the same Chinese characters, but in Japan a distinction is made between kangaku and sinology.

See also 
 Sinology
 Jugaku
 Kokugaku
 Yōgaku (Rangaku)

References

External links 

 Kangaku (Sinology) - Japanese Wiki Corpus

Sinology
Japanese philosophy